Cunninghame South was a constituency of the House of Commons of the Parliament of the United Kingdom (at Westminster) from 1983 until 2005. It was represented by one Member of Parliament (MP) elected by the first-past-the-post system of election.

In 2005 a northern area of the constituency was merged with Cunninghame North to form North Ayrshire and Arran. The rest of the Cunninghame South constituency was merged with a northern area from Ayr and a small area from Carrick, Cumnock and Doon Valley to form Central Ayrshire.

The Cunninghame South constituency of the Scottish Parliament, which was created in 1999 with the same boundaries as the Westminster constituency, continues in existence unaltered.

Boundaries
The Cunninghame District electoral divisions of Irvine Central, Irvine South, and Kilwinning and Stevenston.

The constituency was created to cover part of the Cunninghame district of the Strathclyde region, and it included the town of Irvine. The rest of the district was covered by Cunninghame North.

In 1996 the Cunninghame district was reconstituted as the North Ayrshire council area, but the constituency boundaries remained unchanged until the seat disappeared in 2005.

Members of Parliament

Election results

Elections in the 1980s

Elections in the 1990s

Elections in the 2000s

References 

Historic parliamentary constituencies in Scotland (Westminster)
Constituencies of the Parliament of the United Kingdom established in 1983
Constituencies of the Parliament of the United Kingdom disestablished in 2005
Politics of North Ayrshire
Ardrossan−Saltcoats−Stevenston
Kilwinning
Irvine, North Ayrshire